The term Davidist may refer to:

 Followers of David of Dinant, a pantheistic philosopher
 Followers of David Joris, an Anabaptist leader 
 Followers of Ferenc Dávid, also known as Francis David, a Transylvanian Nontrinitarian